Giuseppe Grandi (1843–1894) was an Italian sculptor.

Life
Grandi was born and died in Valganna. Taught by Vela at the Accademia di Brera, in 1866 he won the Canonica competition with a sculpture called Ulisse and began to work on a verist sculpture of Tabacchi at Turin. After his Turin period, he returned to Milan, where he joined the Lombard Scapigliatura school. He was a friend of Cremona and Ranzoni, and with them assumed a renewed anti-academist position and shared their common luministic research. Forgetting neoclassical smoothness and the lucidity of Romantic art, he sought the luministic effects of painting in sculpture.

One of his best-known works is the monument to Cesare Beccaria of 1871, along with the lesser-known paggio di Lara of 1873 and his Maresciallo Ney of 1874.

In 1881 his initial design won a public competition to create a monument to the Five Days of Milan in piazza di Porta Vittoria in Milan. For thirteen years he worked intensively at compositions, modelli, bronze casting, and even created a small menagerie of animals as live models for the work. For each of the Five Days he had many different and well-known models pose, but he died in 1894, before he could see his work inaugurated.

The city of Milan has renamed a piazza after him.

Bibliography
 Gariff, David, "Giuseppe Grandi (1843–1894) and the Milanese Scapigliatura." (Ph.D. dissertation), University of Maryland, College Park, Maryland, 1991.

References

External links

Works
Biography from Galleria Ricci Oddi in Piacenza

1843 births
1894 deaths
19th-century Italian sculptors
Italian male sculptors
People from the Province of Varese
Academic staff of Brera Academy
Brera Academy alumni
Scapigliatura Movement
19th-century Italian male artists